Jabari Carl Bird (born July 3, 1994) is an American former professional basketball player. He played college basketball for the California Golden Bears. He was selected in the second round of the 2017 NBA draft by the Boston Celtics.

High school career

Bird played his high school basketball at Salesian High School where he led the Pride to an overall 100–8 record in his three years on the team. Bird was a McDonald's All-American in high school and was the No. 20 overall recruit in the 2013 class.

College career
As a senior at the University of California, Berkeley, Bird averaged 14.3 points and 4.7 rebounds per game. He suffered a concussion in a loss to Oregon on March 11, 2017.

Professional career

Boston Celtics (2017–2019)
After finishing his senior year at California, Bird was selected with the 56th pick of the 2017 NBA draft by the Boston Celtics. On September 5, 2017, Bird was signed to a two-way contract by the Celtics. Under the terms of the deal, he split time between the Celtics and their G League affiliate, the Maine Red Claws. Bird made his professional debut on October 20, 2017 against the Philadelphia 76ers. He played 13 minutes and scored 3 points in a 108–98 win over the 76ers.

On February 2, 2018, Bird and teammate Kadeem Allen were named to the Midseason All-NBA G League East Team after averaging 19.3 points, 5.7 rebounds and 2.7 assists per game.

On April 6, 2018, Bird scored 15 points in 24 minutes in a Celtics game against the Bulls.

On July 26, 2018, the Boston Celtics re-signed Bird. On September 8, 2018, Bird was arrested and is facing domestic abuse and kidnapping charges. Bird was placed under police guard at a hospital, as was his alleged victim. Before the incident occurred, it was revealed that Bird was previously dealing with emotional issues, including panic attacks.

On February 7, 2019, Bird was traded to the Atlanta Hawks along with cash considerations in exchange for a conditional 2020 second-round pick. He was waived the following day.

Career statistics

NBA

|-
| style="text-align:left;"| 
| style="text-align:left;"| Boston
| 13 || 1 || 8.8 || .577 || .429 || .462 || 1.5 || .6 || .2 || .1 || 3.0
|- class="sortbottom"
| style="text-align:center;" colspan="2"| Career
| 13 || 1 || 8.8 || .577 || .429 || .462 || 1.5 || .6 || .2 || .1 || 3.0

College

|-
| style="text-align:left;"| 2013–14
| style="text-align:left;"| California
| 31 || 12 || 20.0 || .425 || .323 || .804 || 2.0 || 1.1 || .4 || .3 || 8.3
|-
| style="text-align:left;"| 2014–15
| style="text-align:left;"| California
| 23 || 21 || 28.2 || .438 || .369 || .765 || 3.3 || 1.7 || .5 || .4 || 10.5
|-
| style="text-align:left;"| 2015–16
| style="text-align:left;"| California
| 33 || 22 || 26.8 || .461 || .409 || .674 || 3.3 || .9 || .5 || .3 || 10.4
|-
| style="text-align:left;"| 2016–17
| style="text-align:left;"| California
| 27 || 25 || 32.0 || .440 || .365 || .764 || 4.7 || 1.0 || .7 || .2 || 14.3
|- class="sortbottom"
| style="text-align:center;" colspan="2"| Career
| 114 || 80 || 26.4 || .442 || .371 || .753 || 3.3 || 1.2 || .5 || .3 || 10.8

References

External links
 California Golden Bears bio

1994 births
Living people
African-American basketball players
American men's basketball players
Basketball players from California
Boston Celtics draft picks
Boston Celtics players
California Golden Bears men's basketball players
Maine Red Claws players
McDonald's High School All-Americans
Sportspeople from Richmond, California
Shooting guards
21st-century African-American sportspeople